Péter Török (born 22 October 1979) is a Hungarian biologist. He completed his Ph.D. degree in botany from the University of Debrecen, where he is the principal investigator of the MTA-DE Lendület Functional and Restoration Ecology Research Group., supported jointly by the Hungarian Academy of Sciences (MTA) and the University of Debrecen (DE). He is a founder and the co-president (2019-2021) of the Young Academy of Hungary. In 2016 he was awarded by the title ‘Doctor of the Hungarian Academy of Sciences’. He is a member of the Young Academy of Europe (2017-), the council of the International Association for Vegetation Science (IAVS, 2019-), and one of the chairs of its European Dry Grassland working group (2011-). He was a board member in the European Chapter of the Society for Ecological Restoration (SER)

Research areas 
 Dynamical processes in plant communities
 Biodiversity of Palaearctic grasslands
 Grassland restoration and management
 Seed banks and spatial dispersal of vascular plants
 Functional diversity of phytoplankton and benthic diatom communities.

Bibliography 
 List of publications at Google scholar
 List of publications at Scopus
 List of publications at Publons

References

External links 
 Website of the MTA-DE Lendület Functional and Restoration Ecology Research Group
 Professional blog (in Hungarian)

Academic staff of the University of Debrecen
Living people
1979 births
21st-century Hungarian botanists